Strathaven North railway station was a railway station in South Lanarkshire, Scotland.

History 
The line itself was primarily built by iron and coal masters such as William Dixon of the Govan Ironworks to serve the coalmines in the Hamilton, High Blantyre, Meikle Earnock and Quarter areas as well as the ironworks at Quarter. Strathaven North station was opened on the extension of the line from Flemington to Strathaven Central as part of the Mid Lanark Lines scheme to improve rail services in the area.

The first station at Strathaven was the terminus of the Hamilton and Strathaven Railway at Flemington, taken over by the Caledonian Railway; and replaced as a passenger station by Strathaven North railway station in 1904. Strathaven North opened in October 1904, closed temporarily during World War I; and closed permanently on 30 September 1945. The journey along the length of the line took around forty minutes and there were about six return journeys each day.

In 1923 Strathaven North became part of the London Midland and Scottish Railway at the Grouping, passing on to the Scottish Region of British Railways following the 1948 nationalisation of the railways. It was completely closed in 1953 by British Railways when goods services ceased .

Flemington, the Strathaven old station, became a goods station and closed in 1964; no sign now remains of its existence. Strathaven North was in a narrow railway cutting that has now been infilled and built on.

References 
Notes

Sources

External links
RailScot

Railway stations in Great Britain opened in 1904
Railway stations in Great Britain closed in 1917
Railway stations in Great Britain opened in 1919
Railway stations in Great Britain closed in 1945
Disused railway stations in South Lanarkshire
Former Caledonian Railway stations
Strathaven